Jewad Selim (1919–1961) was an Iraqi painter and sculptor born in Ankara, Ottoman Empire in 1919. He became an influential artist through his involvement with the Iraqi Baghdad Modern Art Group, which encouraged artists to explore techniques that combined both Arab heritage and modern art forms. He is considered to be one of Iraq's greatest 20th-century sculptors.

Life and career
Jawad Saleem was born in Ankara, Ottoman Empire into a middle-class family. His parents were both originally from Mosul in Northern Iraq, and his father, Mohammed Hajji Selim was a military officer who had been stationed in Ankara at the time of Saleem's birth, but returned to Baghdad in the 1920s, when the children were relatively young. His father was an amateur artist, his mother was an artist and a skilled embroiderer and his brothers, Saud and Nizarre along with his sister, Naziha Salim all became artists.

Jawad Saleem studied sculpture in Paris (1938-1939) on a scholarship, but his studies were interrupted by the outbreak of war. He relocated to Rome (1939-1940), but again his studies were interrupted by war, forcing him to return to Baghdad. At war's end, he enrolled at the Slade School, London (1946-1948), where he was heavily influenced by Western artists such as Pablo Picasso and Henry Moore. In England, he met an artist, Lorna, a native of Sheffield, and the pair were married in 1950.

During the hiatus in his studies, Saleem was employed at the Directorate of Antiquities in Baghdad between 1940–1945 and was appointed head of the Sculpture Department at the Institute of Fine Arts in Baghdad, a position he retained until his death in 1961. His work exposed him to Iraq's ancient art traditions, and he consciously sought to discover the possibilities of combining ancient motifs with within the modern abstract art he had observed in Europe. His wife, Lorna Saleem, noted that he was fascinated with ancient Egyptian and Mesopotamian sculptures. She explained:

He is generally credited with being the first Iraqi artist to draw on his heritage and guide local artists towards a distinctly Iraqi style.

Iraq in the 1930s had few art museums or galleries. Accordingly, Saleem's first solo exhibition was held in the private home of prominent Iraqi architect, Mohamed Makiya. In 1944, he was invited to work with historical masterpieces and to assist archaeologists in any restoration work that was necessary. These encounters with ancient heritage fostered a strong sense of pride in Iraq's ancient art heritage and questions about the nexus between 'heritage' and 'contemporary' art which would preoccupy the artist and philosopher for the rest of his working life.

In 1951, he gave a public lecture in which he spoke critically and bitterly about public taste in Iraq. For this, Saleem became known as an 'enemy of the people.' Yet within two decades, Saleem was praised by the Iraqi elite and his reputation was mythologised by poets and writers.

He was one of the founders of the Jama'et Baghdad lil Fen al-Hadith (The Baghdad Modern Art Group, founded in 1951) with fellow artist Shakir Hassan Al Said and Mohammed Ghani Hikmat (1929-2011); a group which attempted to combine ancient Iraqi art traditions with modern European techniques.  The group's mantra, was istilham al-turath – seeking inspiration from tradition. Saleem, along with al-Said and other members of the Modern Baghdad group were inspired by the 13th-century Baghdad School and the work of ancient calligraphers and illustrators such as Yahya Al-Wasiti who was active in Baghdad in the 1230s. They believed that the Mongol invasion of 1258 represented a "break in the chain of pictorial Iraqi art"  and wanted to recover lost traditions. After the death of Saleem in 1961, al-Said headed the group. This group accomplished a great deal in terms of popularising modern art by giving Iraqis a sense of national pride in their ancient art heritage.

Saleem first came to the attention of international audiences in 1952 when his competition entry, The Unknown Political Prisoner was one of 80 selected out of 3,500 entries for exhibition at the Tate Gallery in London and was the only Arab artist to be included in the exhibition. The following year he toured the United States and his work was well received.

Although he worked both as a painter and sculptor, he always had misgivings about practising both simultaneously. Towards the end of the 1950s, he made the decision to focus exclusively on sculpture.

In 1959, shortly after Iraq gained independence, Saleem was commissioned by the new leader of the republic, Brigadier General 'Abd al-Karim Qasim to create a monument for the city centre that would be a celebration to Iraq's declaration of independence. It was to be situated in the heart of Baghdad's central business district, overlooking Liberation Square and Jamhouriyya Bridge. The sculptor understood that the monument would need to be a symbol of a new world, and designed a work that was a narrative of the 1958 revolution, but that also paid homage to Iraq's deep art history by including Abbasid and Babylonian wall-reliefs, producing a sculpture that was both "strikingly modern" yet also referenced tradition. 

Saleem laboured on the project under difficult conditions, resisting all attempts by Qasim to have his image incorporated. Initially, Saleem had wanted the sculpture to be at ground level, but the architect, Rifa'at Chadirchi insisted that it be elevated so that it would look more 'monumental'. As a result, the completed work faces the busy traffic rather than people walking in the adjacent gardens. Although the monument was Saleem's design, he did not see it through to completion; following his premature death, the project was completed in 1961 by Saleem's friend, Mohammed Ghani Hikmat, who had previously been assisting on the project by casting the bronze figures. The completed monument, known as Nasb al-Hurriyah ("Monument of Freedom"), has survived various attempts to have it pulled down and is one of Baghdad's most iconic public works.

Saleem is credited as being the most influential artist in Iraq's modern art movement and is said to have brought a 'modern vision' to Iraq. The Iraqi intellectual, Jabra Ibrahim Jabra wrote of him:

Saleem suffered a heart attack and died in the Republican Hospital on 23 January 1961 aged 42 years. His wife, Lorna was with him, and he was surrounded by his friends from the arts community; Hafidh al-Droubi, Ismail al-Sheikhli, Said Shaker, Mohammed Abdel Wahab, Bahir Faeq, Salem Damluji and Khalid Al-Qasab as well as his former student and colleague, Khaled al-Rahal who was reduced to tears and made a death mask of his mentor, the man to whom he had been utterly devoted during his lifetime. Scholars have suggested that his premature death can be attributed, at least in part, to the stresses of completing the Nasb al-Hurriyah sculpture. His demise was seen as an "irreparable loss to Arab visual culture."

Work

Saleem consciously included Assyrian and Babylonian architectural features into his artworks - and was one of the first Iraqi artists to forge links with Iraq's ancient civilisations and their artistic traditions.

Examples of his work are held in the Jordan National Gallery of Fine Art. 
Saleem is especially known for his Nasb al-Hurriyah, located in Tahir Square, one of the main squares in Baghdad's city centre. The monument consists of 14 bronze castings, representing 25 figures on a travertine slab, raised 6 metres off the ground. It provides a narrative of the 1958 Revolution of Iraq with references to Iraqi history by incorporating Assyrian and Babylonian wall-reliefs. It is meant to be read as a verse of Arabic poetry - from right to left - beginning with events that preceded the revolution - and concluding with harmony following independence. The sculpture featured on the 10,000 dinar bank note for 2013-2015 in his honour.
The multiple references and hidden layers of meaning in the work inspired Arab artists across the region and encouraged them to pursue artwork with a national identity at a time when many Arab nations were attaining independence.

Notable public works

 Motherhood, 1954 - a looted sculpture that has since been returned to Iraq's National collection
 Nasb al-Hurriyah, (Monument of Freedom, also known as Liberty Monument), bass relief, 50 X 10 metres, Tahir Square, Baghdad (completed in 1961).

Notable smaller sculptures

 The Unknown Political Prisoner, plaster maquette, 1952
 A Man and a Woman, plaster relief, (45 X 45 cm), 1953
 A Man and a Woman, plaster relief, (45 X 45 cm), 1953 
 Man and the Earth, 1955
 Mother and Child, 1953 (in the Barjeel Art collection)

Select list of paintings

 The Baghdadi Family, 1953
 Children Playing, oil on canvas, 1953–54
 Hilal Decoration, 1955
 Al-Zafa, 1956
 Musicians in the Street, 1956
 Baghdadiat, 1957
 Kid Women, 1957
 A Woman and a Girl, 1957
 Henna Night, 1957
 Seedling Seller, 1957
  Woman Adorned, 1957
 Two Boys Eating al-Raqi (watermelons), 1958 (This work can be seen hanging on the wall in the portrait of Saleem picture above.)
 The Girl and the Gardener, 1958
 Siesta, 1958
 The Dead Tree, 1958
 Girl and Dove, 1958
 Mosque of Kufa, 1958
 Tailoring, 1958
 In the Forum of the Caliph, 1958
 Woman with Coffee Pot, watercolour, private collection, date unknown

See also

 Arabic art
 Iraqi art
 Islamic art
 Islamic calligraphy
 Hurufiyah Art Movement
 List of Muslim painters
 List of Iraqi artists
 Fathi Safwat Kirdar

References

Parts of this article have been translated from the Arabic Wikipedia.

External links
 Modern Art Iraq Archive Electronic resource maintained by Iraqi artists to preserve Iraq's art heritage and includes reproductions of artworks, many of which were looted from the Museum of Modern Art in 2003 and remain missing. These works are not accessible in any other public source.

Further reading
 Ali, W., Modern Islamic Art: Development and Continuity, University of Florida Press, 1997
 Shabout, N.M., Modern Arab Art: Formation of Arab Aesthetics, University of Florida Press, 2007
 Bloom J. and Blair, S., The Grove Encyclopedia of Islamic Art and Architecture, Oxford University Press, 2009 Vols 1-3
 Reynolds, D.F. (ed.), The Cambridge Companion to Modern Arab Culture, Cambridge University Press, 2015 ( Or Khoury, N.N.N. "Art" in  Dwight, F. Reynolds (ed.), The Cambridge Companion to Modern Arab Culture, Cambridge University Press, 2015, pp 191–208
 Faraj, M., Strokes Of Genius: Contemporary Art from Iraq, London, Saqi Books, 2001 
 Schroth, M-A. (ed.), Longing for Eternity: One Century of Modern and Contemporary Iraqi Art, Skira, 2014 
 Bahrani, Z. and Shabout, N.M., Modernism and Iraq, Miriam and Ira D. Wallach Art Gallery and Columbia University, 2009 
 "Iraq: Arts" Encyclopedia Britannica, Online:

1919 births
1961 deaths
20th-century sculptors
20th-century Iraqi painters
Abstract sculptors
Artists from Baghdad
Iraqi contemporary artists
Turkish emigrants
Iraqi sculptors
People from Ankara
Immigrants to Iraq
Iraqi expatriates in France
Iraqi expatriates in Italy
Iraqi expatriates in the United Kingdom